Roy Geary may refer to:

 Roy Geary (Prison Break), a Prison Break character
 Roy C. Geary (1896–1983), Irish statistician